Down to a Sunless Sea may refer to:
 Down to a Sunless Sea (Graham novel), a 1979 novel by David Graham
 Down to a Sunless Sea (Carter novel), a 1984 novel by Lin Carter